Hymenaea is a genus of plants in the legume family Fabaceae. Of the fourteen living species in the genus, all but one are native to the tropics of the Americas, with one additional species (Hymenaea verrucosa) on the east coast of Africa. Some authors place the African species in a separate monotypic genus, Trachylobium. In the Neotropics, Hymenaea is distributed through the Caribbean islands, and from southern Mexico to Brazil. Linnaeus named the genus in 1753 in Species Plantarum for Hymenaios, the Greek god of marriage ceremonies. The name is a reference to the paired leaflets.

Most species of Hymenaea are large trees and they are primarily evergreen. Some species will grow both as tall forest trees and as smaller shrubby trees depending on their surrounding habitat. The leaves are pinnately bifoliolate, meaning that they have two leaflets attached to the sides of the petiole. The flowers grow in a panicle or corymb type of inflorescence.

Uses and properties 

The pulpy center of the fruits is edible and contains starch. The fruit is sold in local markets in the Americas.  The leaves may be used to make a tea.  The trees produce a dense wood used for timber in making ships and furniture.  The thick bark of some species is used by indigenous peoples of the Amazon to make canoes.  Seeds contain large amounts (40% of dry weight) of a highly viscous polysaccharide (xyloglucan) which can be used in several industrial sectors such as food, paper, cosmetic and pharmaceutical.

The trees also make hard resins that are used to manufacture varnish, especially the resin from Hymenaea courbaril (jatobá) in Brazil.  The resin that is produced in Brazil is known as South American copal, and Hymenaea verrucosa is the source of the valuable Zanzibar copal.  Resin may be collected from living trees, or from the soil near the place where a tree once stood.  Throughout its American range, indigenous peoples use the resin for incense and as a cement.  Resin from the extinct species Hymenaea protera is the source of Dominican amber, while the extinct Hymenaea mexicana produced the resin which is the source of Mexican amber.

Hymenaea courbaril has been used as a model organism to study the effect of increased  concentration on the rate of photosynthesis in neotropical regions.

This suggests  the species could play an important role in greenhouse gas sequestration, as atmospheric  is expected to reach ca. 700 ppm by the year 2075 if current levels of fossil fuel consumption are maintained.

Hymenaea courbaril is a very important species in programmes of recuperation of degraded rain forests in the Neotropics. It appears late in the natural regeneration process being classified as a 'late successional' or climax species.

Species
Hymenaea allendis
Hymenaea aurea
Hymenaea courbaril
Hymenaea eriogyne
Hymenaea intermedia
Hymenaea maranhensis
Hymenaea martiana
Hymenaea mexicana 
Hymenaea oblongifolia
Hymenaea parvifolia
Hymenaea protera 
Hymenaea reticulata
Hymenaea rubriflora
Hymenaea stigonocarpa
Hymenaea torrei
Hymenaea velutina
Hymenaea verrucosa
†Extinct

See also 
 Animé, an oleo-resin from Hymenaea species.

References

Further reading

 
Fabaceae genera